Baghrān is the northernmost district in Helmand Province, Afghanistan. Its population, which is 99% Pashtun and 1% Hazara, was estimated at 82,018 in 2002. The district centre is the village of Baghran; there are around 450 villages in the district.

Dominated by the Baghran Valley, a traditional stronghold of traditionalist Afghan Pashtun tribal power, Baghran saw significant military clashes during the Russian occupation.  Rais-al-Baghrani, a former Taliban leader, recently agreed to cooperate with the Government of Afghanistan and the Coalition forces, under the Programme Takm-e-sol (Reconciliation and Forgiveness). Baghran district's primary produce (after opium poppies) is wheat.

References
UNHCR District Profile, dated 2002-12-31, accessed 2006-07-28 (PDF).

External links
Map of Baghran district (PDF)

Districts of Helmand Province